Gyan Bharati School is an English medium co-educational school, established in 1980. It is located in Saket next to PVR, New Delhi, India, and has classes from Nursery to the 12th standard. The school has 8 houses: Abhimanyu (Light Blue), Bharat (Violet), Dhruv (Indigo), Kasturba (Green), Prahlad (Yellow), Shravan (Orange), Lakshmibai (Red) & Siddharth (Maroon).

The founding Principal of this school was M. N. Kapur. It is owned by the Ansal Group.

Overview
Facilities include cricket pitch, football field, ground hockey field, running track, basketball court, open air amphitheatre, indoor auditorium and library. The director of the school is Late Shri. R. C. Shekhar.

See also
Education in India
List of schools in India
List of schools in Delhi affiliated with CBSE

References

External links
 Gyan Bharati School website
 Central Board of Secondary Education

Schools in Delhi
Educational institutions established in 1980
1980 establishments in Delhi